Yanzhao Metropolis Daily or Yanzhao Dushibao, also known as Yanzhao Metropolitan Daily, is a morning newspaper published in the Hebei province of the People's Republic of China. It is owned by Hebei Daily Newspaper Group, which also publishes Hebei Daily. The paper focuses on the daily life of the city dwellers.

Yanzhao Metropolis Daily was sponsored by the Hebei Daily Agency  (河北日报社) in January 1996.  Its current circulation is over one million, the number one daily in the Hebei province. It is printed and published in 11 cities of the province in every morning. It has two local editions: Metropolis Express for Shijiazhuang, provincial capital; and East Hebei Edition for Tangshan, a city in eastern Hebei.

References

External links
 Current official website of Yanzhao Metropolis Daily 
  Original official website of Yanzhao Metropolis Daily 

Chinese-language newspapers (Simplified Chinese) 
Daily newspapers published in China
Tangshan
Newspapers established in 1996
Mass media in Shijiazhuang
1996 establishments in China
Chinese Communist Party newspapers